The 2004 ACC Trophy was a cricket tournament in Malaysia, taking place between 12 and 24 June 2004. It gave Associate and Affiliate members of the Asian Cricket Council experience of international one-day cricket and also helps forms an essential part of regional rankings. The tournament was won by the UAE who defeated Oman in the final by 94 runs.

Teams
The teams were separated into four groups: three groups of four teams and one group of three teams. The following teams took part in the tournament:

Group stages
The top two from each group qualified for the quarter-finals.

Group A

Group B

Group C

Group D

Quarter-finals

5th place play-off semi-finals

Semi-final

5th place play-off

3rd place play-off

Final

Statistics

References

External links
CricketArchive tournament page 

ACC Trophy
Acc Trophy, 2004
International cricket competitions in 2004
International cricket competitions in Malaysia